Téo Andant (born 21 July 1999) is a French sprinter and middle-distance runner who specializes in the 400 metres. He won a bronze medal in the 4×400 m relay at the 2022 European Athletics Championships.

References

External links
 

1999 births
Living people
French male sprinters
French male middle-distance runners
Sportspeople from Nice
European Athletics Championships medalists